The University of North Carolina School of Medicine is a professional school within the University of North Carolina at Chapel Hill. It offers a Doctor of Medicine degree along with combined Doctor of Medicine / Doctor of Philosophy or Doctor of Medicine / Master of Public Health degrees.

It is one of the top-ranked medical schools in the country: in 2022, U.S. News & World Report ranked the school 5th in primary care and 25th in research. In 2016, the school received $449 million in research funding. With approximately two-thirds of that amount coming from the National Institutes of Health, the school received more federal research funding than any other public or private university in the South.

Curriculum
As of fall 2014, UNC School of Medicine is changing its curriculum from the traditional setup below to the "Translational Education at Carolina" (TEC) Curriculum, which will entail a slightly shortened and entirely organ-system-based preclinical foundation before beginning clinical rotations.

First Year
The first-year curriculum consists of four blocks covering the basic medical sciences.  Each block combines daily lectures by faculty from diverse fields, and therefore provides a highly integrated curriculum.  The first block, titled Principles of Medicine, includes cellular and molecular biology, biochemistry, microbiology, pharmacology, histology, and genetics.  The second, Immunology, is focused on the human immune system at the cellular level with specific focuses on histology, microbiology, and pharmacology. The third block is hematology, which focuses on the body's blood system, including pathological diseases of blood cells. Specific focuses on histology allows students to gain a better understanding of how the microscopic structure of a tissue affects its physiologic function. The final block, Cardiology, is the first "tissue" block of the first year curriculum. Additionally, students begin anatomy lab with human cadavers as they explore the heart, lungs, mediastinum, and major bones, nerves, and muscles of the chest cavity. In addition to the four core blocks, students have weekly Medicine and Society small groups, where they discuss the role and effects of health care in our society, culture, and ethics.  They also apply their fledgling medical knowledge through occasional case study small groups, called the Clinical Applications Course or "CAC."  First-year students learn basic physical exam skills and patient interviewing skills via the weekly Principles of Clinical medicineor "PCC" small groups, and shadow physicians throughout North Carolina during two "Clinical Weeks."  In between first and second year, many students conduct clinical or medical science research at UNC or at other institutions, or  travel with UNC physicians to clinics in South America, Africa and Asia.

Second Year
The second year begins with the Tools for Diagnosis and Therapy course, which gives students a basic understanding of the various machines and technologies available to aid physical diagnosis (i.e., CT scanners, MRI, etc.).  The second year curriculum is divided into organ system blocks that are 3–8 weeks in length.  As in first year, these blocks offer a highly integrated curriculum; each block covers the physiology, pathology, diagnosis, and treatment of that organ system.  Each semester ends with a capstone "Clinical Cases" course, which allows students to fully exercise their knowledge of diagnosis and therapy.  Students also participate in Humanities & Social Science Seminars that meet once a week for half the year. Clinical exposure expands through the continuation of the Introduction to Clinical Medicine small groups and an additional three Community Weeks.  Lastly, students receive training in the conduction and critical reading of medical research through the Clinical Epidemiology course.  At the end of second year, students take the USMLE Step 1 Exam.

Clinical Years
The third and fourth years take place at UNC Hospitals (~60% of the year) and other institutions throughout the state such as Carolinas Medical Center in Charlotte, and Moses Cone Hospital in Greensboro (~40% of the year). The third year focuses on core specialties of medicine and certain subspecialties.  Through Mountain Area Health Education Center (MAHEC) in Asheville, NC, students can complete longitudinal, integrated core clerkships with the option to pursue rural rotations, with similar opportunities available through Southeast Regional AHEC (SEAHEC) in Wilmington and through Carolinas Medical Center in Charlotte.
 
The fourth year allows students to gain experience in specialties of their interest through several dozen electives.  Every fourth-year student completes at least one Acting Internship, a period in which the student assumes the role of an intern in care of patients (though a physician maintains a supervisory role).

Approximately a quarter of the class takes time off between these two years to pursue a Master of Public Health degree through the UNC School of Public Health or conduct research sponsored by several institutional and national fellowships.

Facilities

Hospitals
The UNC Health Care complex is situated on the southern tip of the UNC campus, and comprises five healthcare facilities collectively known as UNC Hospitals.  The four core hospitals are the North Carolina Memorial Hospital, the North Carolina Children's Hospital, North Carolina Women's Hospital, and North Carolina Neurosciences Hospital.  Together these buildings offer over 700 inpatient beds and comprise a Level 1 referral center.  A fifth core hospital, the North Carolina Cancer Hospital, was opened in 2009, providing additional outpatient clinic space and 50 more beds.  These hospitals are surrounded by satellite facilities in which medical research, education, and outpatient care are carried out.  They include the Ambulatory Care Center, NC Clinical Cancer Center, and the Family Medicine building.

A Charlotte campus is scheduled to open in February 2022 at Presbyterian Hospital with nine third- and fourth-year students and plans for up to 30. UNC already has similar campuses in Asheville and Wilmington.

AHEC Centers
North Carolina has a unique system of Area Health Education Centers across the state.  These allow UNC medical students to spend clinical time in widely varied communities, from tertiary care in Charlotte to rural primary care in the Western mountains. Third year students have the option to attend all core rotations at Carolinas Medical Center a Level 1 Trauma Center in Charlotte.  Additionally, the AHEC centers maintain lists of local physicians who are interested in educating medical students, and UNC students spend substantial time working with doctors in various private practices. The NC AHEC Program is a part of The National AHEC Program.

Alumni
 Donna Feigley Barbisch (MPH), U.S. Army major general
 Francis Collins - director of the NIH, and head of the Human Genome Project
 J. Larry Jameson- Dean of the Perelman School of Medicine at the University of Pennsylvania  https://www.med.upenn.edu/evpdean/jameson.html
 Ken Jeong - actor and comedian
 Christopher W. Lentz - U.S. Air Force Brigadier General
 Norman Sharpless - director of the National Cancer Institute (NCI)

References

External links

U.S. News & World Report

Medicine
Medical schools in North Carolina
Educational institutions established in 1879
1879 establishments in North Carolina